The 1846 Massachusetts gubernatorial election was held on November 9.

Incumbent Whig Governor George N. Briggs was re-elected to a fourth term in office over Democrat Isaac Davis.

General election

Candidates
Francis Baylies, former U.S. Chargé d'Affaires in Buenos Aires and U.S. Representative from Taunton (American)
Isaac Davis, State Senator from Worcester and candidate for Governor in 1845 (Democratic)
George N. Briggs, incumbent Governor since 1844 (Whig)
Samuel Edmund Sewall, Liberty nominee for Governor since 1842 (Liberty)

Results

See also
 1846 Massachusetts legislature

References

Governor
1846
Massachusetts
November 1846 events